Please add names of notable painters with a Wikipedia page, in precise English alphabetical order, using U.S. spelling conventions. Country and regional names refer to where painters worked for long periods, not to personal allegiances.

Jean Tabaud (1914–1996), French portrait painter and war artist
Enrique Tábara (born 1930), Ecuadorian painter and teacher
Augustus Vincent Tack (1870–1949), American painter
Tadanori Yokoo (横尾忠則, born 1936), Japanese graphic designer, print-maker and painter
Sophie Taeuber-Arp (1889–1943), Swiss painter, sculptor and interior designer
Hiroyuki Tajima (田嶋宏行, 1911–1984), Japanese print-maker
Judy Takács (born 1962), American painter
Hiromitsu Takahashi (高橋宏光, born 1959), Japanese artist and stencil print-maker
Takahashi Yuichi (高橋由一, 1828–1894), Japanese painter
Takehisa Yumeji (竹久夢二, 1884–1934), Japanese painter and poet
Takeuchi Seihō (竹内栖鳳, 1864–1942), Japanese nihonga painter
Allen Butler Talcott (1867–1908), American painter
Algernon Talmage (1871–1939), English painter
Reuben Tam (1916–1991), American painter, educator and poet
Rufino Tamayo (1899–1991), Mexican painter
Tanaka Isson (田中一村, 1908–1977), Japanese nihonga painter
Tang Di (唐棣, 1287–1355), Chinese painter
Tang Yifen (湯貽汾, 1778–1853), Chinese painter and calligrapher
Tang Yin (唐寅, 1470–1524), Chinese painter, calligrapher and poet
Josefina Tanganelli Plana (1904–1966), Spanish painter
Yves Tanguy (1900–1955), French painter
Tani Bunchō (1763–1840), Japanese painter and poet
Henry O. Tanner (1859–1937), Early African-American artist
Dorothea Tanning (1910–2012), American painter, sculptor and writer
Tanomura Chikuden (1777–1835), Japanese painter
Tan Ting-pho (1895–1947), Taiwanese oil painter
Michel Tapié (1909–1987), French art critic and theorist
Antoni Tàpies (1923–2012), Spanish Catalan painter
Caterina Tarabotti (active 1659), Italian painter
Edmund Charles Tarbell (1862–1938), American painter
Alain Tasso, poet, painter and critic
Vladimir Tatlin (1885–1953), Russian painter and architect
Jules Tavernier (1844–1889), French painter and illustrator
Tawaraya Sōtatsu (俵屋宗達, c. 1570–1643), Japanese painter and designer
Alasdair Grant Taylor (1934–2007), Scottish painter, draftsman and sculptor
Daniel Taylor (born 1955), Canadian painter
Eric Taylor (1909–1999), English artist
Persis Goodale Thurston Taylor (1821–1906), American/Hawaiian 
Shirley Teed (1933–2018), English painter
Afewerk Tekle (1932–2012), Ethiopian painter and stained-glass designer
Abraham van den Tempel (1622–1672), Dutch painter
Carpoforo Tencalla (1623–1685), Swiss/Italian painter and frescoist
Jan Tengnagel (1584–1635), Dutch draftsman and painter
David Teniers the Elder (1582–1649), Flemish painter
David Teniers the Younger (1610–1690), Flemish/Dutch painter, print-maker and copyist
David Teniers III (1638–1685), Flemish painter
Jason Teraoka (born 1964), American painter
Hendrick Terbrugghen (1588–1629), Dutch painter
Pietro Testa (1617–1650), Italian artist, print-maker and draftsman
Wlodzimierz Tetmajer (1861–1923), Polish painter
Mór Than (1828–1899), Hungarian painter
Frits Thaulow (1847–1906), Norwegian painter
Abbott Handerson Thayer (1849–1921), American artist, naturalist and teacher
Theophanes the Greek (1340–1410), Byzantine artist and icon painter
Jan Theuninck (born 1954), Belgian painter and poet
Wayne Thiebaud (born 1920), American painter
Alma Thomas (1894–1978), American painter and art educator
Brian Thomas (1912–1980), English church painter
Robert Thomas (1926–1999), Welsh sculptor
André Thomkins (1930–1985), Swiss/German painter, illustrator and poet
Bob Thompson (1937–1966), American painter
Ernest Heber Thompson (1891–1971), New Zealand painter and print-maker
Ernst Thoms (1896–1983), German painter
Adam Bruce Thomson (1885–1976), Scottish painter and educator
Charles Thomson (born 1953), English painter, poet and photographer
John Thomson of Duddingston (1778–1840), Scottish painter and Church of Scotland minister
Tom Thomson (1877–1917), Canadian artist
William John Thomson (1771–1845), English painter and miniaturist
William Thon (1906–2000), American painter
Jens Jørgen Thorsen (1932–2000), Danish artist
Ernő Tibor (1885–1945), Hungarian painter and Holocaust victim
Giovanni Battista Tiepolo (1696–1770), Venetian painter and print-maker
Louis Comfort Tiffany (1848–1933), American artist and designer
Lajos Tihanyi (1885–1938), Hungarian painter and lithographer
Walasse Ting (1929–2010), Chinese/American painter
Tintoretto (1518–1594), Italian painter
James Tissot (1836–1902), French painter
Titian (1488–1576), Italian painter
Ettore Tito (1859–1941), Italian painter
Alton Tobey (1914–2005), American painter, muralist and art teacher
Mark Tobey (1890–1976), American painter
A. R. Middleton Todd (1891–1966), English artist
Giuseppe Tominz (1790–1866), Austro-Hungarian (Slovenian)/Italian painter
Tomioka Tessai (富岡鉄斎, 1837–1924), painter and calligrapher
Bradley Walker Tomlin (1899–1955), American artist
Hannah Tompkins (1920–1995) American painter and print-maker
Gentile Tondino (1923–2001), Canadian artist and educator
Stanisław Tondos (1854–1917), Austro-Hungarian (Polish) painter
Henry Tonks (1862–1937), English draftsman, painter and surgeon
Jacob Toorenvliet (1640–1719), Dutch painter
Rodolphe Töpffer (1799–1847), Swiss painter, caricaturist and teacher
Torii Kiyomasu (鳥居清倍, fl. 1690s – 1720s), Japanese ukiyo-e painter and print-maker
Torii Kiyomasu II (鳥居清倍, c. 1720–1750), Japanese ukiyo-e painter and woodblock print-maker
Torii Kiyomitsu (鳥居清満, 1735–1785), Japanese ukiyo-e painter and print-maker
Torii Kiyomoto (鳥居清元, 1645–1702), Japanese ukiyo-e painter and kabuki actor
Torii Kiyonaga (勝川春潮, 1752–1815), Japanese ukiyo-e artist
Torii Kiyonobu I (鳥居清信, 1664–1729), Japanese ukiyo-e painter and print-maker
Toriyama Sekien (鳥山石燕, 1712–1788), Japanese ukiyo-e artist and scholar
Þórarinn B. Þorláksson (1867–1924), Icelandic painter
Veikko Törmänen (born 1945), Finnish painter and graphic artist
János Tornyai (1869–1936), Hungarian painter 
Joaquín Torres García (1874–1949), Uruguayan painter
Tosa Mitsunobu (土佐光信, 1434–1525), Japanese painter
Tosa Mitsuoki (土佐光起, 1617–1691), Japanese painter
Henri de Toulouse-Lautrec (1864–1901), French painter, print-maker and illustrator
Pierre Toutain-Dorbec (born 1951), French/American photographer, artist and author
Toyen (1902–1980), Czech painter, draftsman and illustrator
Toyohara Chikanobu (豊原周延, 1838–1912) Japanese woodblock artist
Toyohara Kunichika (豊原国周, 1835–1900) Japanese woodblock artist
Friedrich Traffelet (1897–1954), Swiss painter and illustrator
Kurt Trampedach (born 1943), Danish painter
Bill Traylor (1854–1947), American artist
Henric Trenk (1818–1892), Swiss/Romanian painter and graphic artist
Vladimir Tretchikoff (1913–2006), Russian artist
Carlos Trillo Name, Cuban painter
J. W. Tristram (1870–1938), Australian watercolor artist
Vasily Andreevich Tropinin (1776–1857), Russian Romantic painter
Clovis Trouille (1889–1975), French painter and decorator
Jean-François de Troy (1679–1752), French painter and tapestry designer
Wilhelm Trübner (1851–1917), German painter
John Trumbull (1756–1843), American artist during the American Revolutionary War
Ivan Trush (1869–1941), Russian (Ukrainian)/Soviet painter and critic
Tsuchida Bakusen (土田麦僊, 1887–1936) Japanese painter
Tsuji Kakō (都路華香, 1870–1931), Japanese painter
Tsukioka Yoshitoshi (月岡芳年, 1839–1892), Japanese artist
Israel Tsvaygenbaum (born 1961), Russian/American artist
Werner Tübke (1929–2004), German painter
Tony Tuckson (1921–1973), Australian artist
Thomas Tudor (1785–1855), Welsh artist and land agent
Henry Scott Tuke (1858–1929), English artist
Mym Tuma (born 1940), American artist
Bernt Tunold (1877–1946), Norwegian painter
John Doman Turner (1873–1938), English painter
J. M. W. Turner 1775–1850), English painter and print-maker (historically known as William Turner) 
William Turner of Oxford (1789–1862), English landscape painter
Glennray Tutor (born 1950), American painter
Laurits Tuxen (1853–1927), Danish painter and sculptor
Luc Tuymans (born 1958), Belgian contemporary artist
John Henry Twachtman (1853–1902), American painter
Stanley Twardowicz (1917–2008), American painter and photographer
William Twigg-Smith (1883–1950), New Zealand/American painter, illustrator and musician
Cy Twombly (1928–2011), American artist
Dwight William Tryon (1849–1925), American painter
Ralph Burke Tyree (1921–1979), American painter

References
References can be found under each entry.

T